Archie Miller may refer to:

 Archie Miller (Medal of Honor) (1878–1921), U.S. Army officer and Medal of Honor recipient
 Archie H. Miller (1886–1958), lieutenant governor of Minnesota
 Archie Miller (basketball) (born 1978), American basketball coach and former player
 Archie Miller (footballer) (1913–2006), Scottish footballer

See also
 Archibald Miller (disambiguation)